Daniel Barnet Lazarus (20 October 1866 in Bendigo, Victoria, Australia - 9 March 1932 in Melbourne, Victoria, Australia) was an Australian politician, and the youngest mayor in Victoria, at the age of 26, in 1893.

References

External links
Daniel Barnet Lazarus at Victorian Parliament

1866 births
1932 deaths
Mayors of places in Victoria (Australia)
Members of the Victorian Legislative Assembly